Hugh Geoffrey Thomas (born 15 October 1938 in Merthyr Tydfil) is a Welsh pastor. He was the pastor of Alfred Place Baptist Church for fifty years.

Thomas studied at the University College of Cardiff and Westminster Theological Seminary. He is Visiting Professor of Historical Theology at Puritan Reformed Theological Seminary.

In 2013, a Festschrift was prepared in his honour. The Holy Spirit and Reformed Spirituality includes contributions from Carl Trueman, Joel Beeke, and Derek Thomas.

In 2022, his Autobiography was released. In The Shadow of the Rock.

References

External links
 Geoffrey Thomas, biography, Banner of Truth publisher

Living people
1938 births
People from Merthyr Tydfil
Welsh Protestant ministers and clergy
Westminster Theological Seminary alumni
Alumni of Cardiff University